Menachem Birnbaum (born 1893 in Vienna, died probably 1944), was an Austrian Jewish book illustrator and portrait painter.

Life 

Birnbaum was the second son of the Jewish philosopher Nathan Birnbaum and his wife Rosa Korngut. Birnbaum married Ernestine (Tina) Esther Helfmann, with whom he had two children: Rafael Zwi and Hana. Birnbaum lived in Berlin from 1911 until 1914 and again from 1919 until 1933. He then emigrated to the Netherlands. In the spring of 1943 he was arrested by the Gestapo and with his relatives transported on 10 March 1943 to a Nazi concentration camp - presumably Auschwitz. Menachem was seen alive and spoken to in Auschwitz in October 1944 by a Dutch Jewish survivor, who told this to his brother Uriel Birnbaum in Holland after WW2. His family Tina, Rafael Zwi, and Hana Birnbaum were killed earlier (probably in Auschwitz also). Therefore he must have died between October 1944 and January 27, 1945 - when Auschwitz was liberated by the Soviets. It is likely that he died during or just before the Death March from Auschwitz in mid-January, 1945. Therefore the information that he died in the Sobibor extermination camp is incorrect. It is based solely on an unconfirmed assumption by the Red Cross that the trains from the German holding camp at Westerbork, Holland went to Sobibor on that day.

Works 
 Das Hohe Lied (The High Song), Berlin 1912
 Der Aschmedaj (Humorous periodical), Berlin-Warsaw 1912
 Schlemiel (Humorous periodical), Berlin 1919-1920 (Schriftleitung des künstlerischen Teils)
 Chad Gadjo, Berlin 1920
 Chad Gadjo, Scheveningen 1935
 Menachem Birnbaum Zeigt, Den Haag 1937
   Numerous book cover/jacket designs, portrait drawings.

Literature 
 Kitty Zijlmans, Jüdische Künstler im Exil: Uriel und Menachem Birnbaum; in: Hans Wuerzner (Hg.), Österreichische Exilliteratur in den Niederlanden 1934-1940, Amsterdam 1986

References

External links 
 
 Das jüdische Jugendbuch a digitized children's book illustrated by Birnbaum at the Leo Baeck Institute, New York

1893 births
1944 deaths
Artists from Vienna
Austrian Jews who died in the Holocaust
Austrian artists
Austrian people who died in Auschwitz concentration camp
Austrian illustrators
Jewish artists